Katelco was a telecommunications company in Kazakhstan founded in 1995. It closed in 2011.

History 
Katelco was established in 1995 as an integrated system to provide satellite television (including direct-to-home service Katelco Plus), radio, data transmission (including internet access), and telephony. The name is an abbreviation for "Kazakhstani Telecommunications Company".

Katelco provided broadcast services for national, regional and corporate TV. It owned and operated of the National Satellite Broadcasting System (NSBS) and Satellite Multi-channel Digital Broadcasting System of Direct Broadcasting "Katelco Plus". It owned main control center in Almaty and teleports in Nur-Sultan and Oral with uplink facilities in other regional capitals.

Among other resources, it used the KazSat satellite.

In 2007 Katelco was listed among top 10 Kazakhstan communication operators by the Russian telecom business magazine InformCourier-Svyaz.

31 January 2011 the company was merged into the Kazteleradio, JSC - national terrestrial and satellite operator of Kazakhstan for television and radio broadcasting.

References

External links
Katelco home page

Mass media in Kazakhstan
Companies of Kazakhstan
Telecommunications companies established in 1995
Companies disestablished in 2011
Mass media in Almaty